Frederico Fonseca Pires Almeida Duarte (born 30 March 1999) is a Portuguese professional footballer who plays as a left winger for Greek Super League club Panetolikos.

Club career
Duarte made his Super League Greece debut for Panetolikos on 7 April 2019 in a game against Olympiacos.

On 26 June 2019, Panetolikos acquired his rights from Vilafranquense. The young winger signed a contract until the summer of 2022.

References

External links

1999 births
Living people
Portuguese footballers
Association football midfielders
Super League Greece players
Segunda Divisão players
U.D. Vilafranquense players
Panetolikos F.C. players
Portuguese expatriate footballers
Portuguese expatriate sportspeople in Greece
Expatriate footballers in Greece
Footballers from Lisbon